Pluchea carolinensis is a plant in the genus Pluchea.

Description
Pluchea carolinensis is a plant from the genus Pluchea, the species was first described by the Scottish Botanist George Don. It is a shrub that can grow up to 2.5m tall and has large leaves, which are longer than wide.

Names 
This species has many common names, reflecting its widespread use as a medicinal plant. In the Spanish Caribbean it is known as salvia blanca, salvia cimarron, salvia del pais, salvia santa, salvia olorosa, and salvia real, amongst others, all referring to its resemblance to the European herb sage (Salvia officinalis). Its medicinal properties are alluded to in the English names cure for all, bushy fleabane, and cough bush and the French guerit-tout. Its similarity to tobacco has given rise to the names tabac a jacquot, tabac du diable, and tabac marron.

Distribution
Pluchea carolinensis is common in North, Central and South America as well as the Caribbean, and is naturalized in Florida, Hawaii and some other Pacific islands, and Taiwan. The plant is endemic to Aruba where it has the status of a protected plant.

Habitat
Pluchea carolinensis is said to grow on both wet and dry soil where it prefers to be in a sunny spot. It is common to be cultivated in gardens in various countries in South and Central America.

References

carolinensis